Jauer is a surname. Notable people with the surname include:

 Nicholas Magni of Jauer (c.1355–1435)
 Bolko I the Strict, Duke of Schweidnitz-Jauer
 Georg Jauer (1896–1971), Panzer general in the German army during World War II

de:Jauer